3,5-Dinitrobenzoic acid is an organic chemical that is an important corrosion inhibitor and is also used in photography. This aromatic compound is used by chemists to identify alcohol components in esters and in the fluorometric analysis of creatinine.

Synthesis 
3,5-dinitrobenzoic acid is obtained from benzoic acid by the nitration reaction with nitric acid in the presence of concentrated sulfuric acid.

The nitration can also be started with 3-nitrobenzoic acid, which leads to yields of approximately 98 %.

Properties 
3,5-Dinitrobenzoic acid is an odorless, yellowish solid. Due to the mesomeric effect of the two nitro groups, it is more acidic (pKa = 2.82) than benzoic acid (pKa = 4.20) and 3-nitrobenzoic acid (pKa = 3.47).

Uses 
3,5-Dinitrobenzoic acid finds use in the identification of various organic substances, especially alcohols, by derivatization. For such an analysis, the substance to be analyzed is reacted with 3,5-dinitrobenzoic acid in the presence of sulfuric acid in order to form a derivate. By doing so, many substances that are liquid or have a low melting point are converted to easily crystallized derivates with sharp melting points. For instance, alcohols can be identified by the melting point of their esters with 3,5-dinitrobenzoic acid. This method is also applicable to a large number of amines.

Compared to 4-nitrobenzoic acid, another acid that is used similarly, derivates of 3,5-dinitrobenzoic acid have higher melting points, so that it is preferred when the 4-nitrobenzoic acid derivate has a melting point too low to be accurately identified.

For more sensitive compounds, the reaction is carried out using the acid chloride, 3,5-dinitrobenzoyl chloride. This allows for example the identification of amino acids.

References

Literature

External links 
 MSDS Data

Nitrobenzenes
Benzoic acids
Corrosion inhibitors